Piers is an old English given name and surname, and has the same origins as Peter. Its meaning is 'rock, stone'.

People with the given name

 Piers Adam (born 1964), British businessman
 Piers Adams (born 1963), British recorder player
 Piers Akerman (born 1950), Australian journalist, conservative commentator and columnist
 Piers Anthony (born 1934), Anglo-American fantasy/science fiction author known for his Xanth series of novels
 Piers Baker (born 1962), British cartoonist
 Piers Baron (born 1983), English musician
 Piers Bengough (1929-2005), British Army officer
 Piers Benn (born 1962), British philosopher
 Piers Bishop (born 1956), British artist
 Piers Bizony (born 1959), Science journalist
 Piers Blaikie (born 1942), British geographer
 Piers Bohl (1865-1921), Latvian mathematician
 Piers Brendon (born 1940), British writer
 Piers Butler, 8th Earl of Ormond (c. 1467–1539)
 Piers Claughton (1814–1884), British Anglican bishop, Archdeacon of London and Chaplain-General of Her Majesty's Forces
 Piers Coleman, British physicist
 Piers Corbyn (born 1947), British weather forecaster, climate change denier and conspiracy theorist 
 Piers Courage (1942–1970), English racing driver
 Piers Crosby (1590-1646), Irish soldier
 Piers Dixon (1928-2017), British Conservative politician 
 Piers Dutton (died 1545), the lord
 Pier Gerlofs Donia (c. 1480-1520), Frisian rebel leader and pirate
 Piers Maxwell Dudley-Bateman (born 1947), Australian landscape painter
 Piers Edgecumbe (c. 1609–1667), English politician
 Piers Edgcumbe, 5th Earl of Mount Edgcumbe (1865-1944), British soldier
 Piers Faccini (born 1970), English singer and painter
 Piers Flint-Shipman (1962-1984), English actor
 Piers Gaveston, 1st Earl of Cornwall (c. 1284-1312), a favourite of King Edward II of England
 Piers Gilliver (born 1994), British wheelchair fencer
 Piers Gough (born 1946), British architect
 Piers Haggard (born 1939), British television and film director
 Piers Lane (born 1958), Australian concert pianist
 Piers Mackesy (born 1924), British military historian
 Piers McDonald (born 1955), Canadian politician and trade unionist
 Piers Merchant (1951–2009), British politician
 Piers Morgan (born 1965), British broadcaster and former tabloid newspaper editor
 Piers Paul Read (born 1941), English novelist, historian and biographer
 Piers Sellers (born 1955), Anglo-American meteorologist and NASA astronaut
 Piers Torday (born 1974), British children's writer
 Piers Wenger  (born 1972), British television producer

Surname
 Piers baronets, two baronetcies created for persons with the surname Piers
 Constance Piers (1866–1939), Canadian journalist, poet, editor
 Dennis Piers (1929–2005), South African cricketer
 Desmond Piers (1913–2005), Royal Canadian Navy rear-admiral
 Harry Piers (1870–1940), Canadian historian
 Henry Piers (1568–1623),  Anglo-Irish Member of Parliament, administrator and writer
 Sir Henry Piers, 1st Baronet (1629–1691),  Anglo-Irish soldier and antiquarian
 John Piers (1522/3–1594), Archbishop of York
 Sir John Piers, 6th Baronet (1772–1845), Irish rake and duellist
 Julie Piers (born 1962), American golfer
 Sarah Piers (died 1719), English literary patron, political commentator and poet
 William Piers (bishop) (c. 1580–1670), British Anglican bishop and Vice-Chancellor of Oxford University
 William Piers (constable) (c. 1510–1603), constable of Carrickfergus

Fictional characters include:
 The title character of Piers Plowman, a Middle English allegorical narrative poem by William Langland
 Piers, one of the Gym Leaders in Pokémon Sword and Shield
 Piers Nivans is the name of a BSAA soldier from the video game Resident Evil 6

See also
 Pier (given name)

Masculine given names
Given names of Greek language origin
Surnames from given names